Sir Walter Dwyer (27 August 1875 – 22 March 1950) was an Australian lawyer, politician, and judge. He was a member of the Legislative Assembly of Western Australia from 1911 to 1914, and later serving as the presiding judge on the State Court of Arbitration from 1926 to 1945.

Early life
Dwyer was born in Carrick-on-Suir, County Tipperary, Ireland. He emigrated to Australia in 1891, and initially lived in Melbourne, where he taught at Christian Brothers College, East Melbourne. In 1895, Dwyer moved to Western Australia, where he worked as a clerk in the Education Department. He also studied law part-time, serving his articles of clerkship in Kalgoorlie, and in 1906 completed a law degree (LL.B.) with the University of London through external study. Dwyer practised law in Kalgoorlie from 1907 to 1909, and then moved to Perth. He was called to the bar in 1907.

Politics
At the 1911 state election, Dwyer stood as the Labor Party candidate for the seat of Perth, having joined the party only the previous year. He defeated the sitting Liberal member, Harry Brown, becoming the first member of the Labor Party to hold the seat. While in parliament, Dwyer helped to draft legislation for the new Labor government of John Scaddan, including an industrial arbitration act, an act to protect borrowers of money, and an act to protect renters. However, he was defeated by James Connolly at the 1914 election, and subsequently returned to his legal practice. He later came to regard the loss of his seat after just a single term as a "blessing in disguise".

Judiciary and later life
After leaving parliament, Dwyer developed a reputation as one of Perth's best labour lawyers. As a barrister, he appeared before the Supreme Court of Western Australia and the High Court of Australia in numerous cases. In 1916, he defended six members of the Industrial Workers of the World who had been charged with sedition. He was also a prominent Irish nationalist, and in 1919 was arrested and fined for leading a prohibited Saint Patrick's Day march. In 1926, the Labor government of Philip Collier appointed Dwyer as the new presiding judge of the State Court of Arbitration, a position which had previously only been held by justices of the supreme court. He served in the position until 1945, and developed a reputation for fairness and impartiality, with a later source describing Western Australia's lack of industrial conflict as "largely due to the confidence in the court that he had created".

Dwyer was created a Knight Bachelor in the 1949 New Year Honours. Outside of his professional career, he was a trustee of the State Library of Western Australia, the Western Australian Museum, and the Art Gallery of Western Australia. Dwyer died in Perth in March 1950, aged 74. He had married Maude Mary Smith in 1912, with whom he had two daughters.

References

1875 births
1950 deaths
Alumni of the University of London
Australian barristers
20th-century Australian judges
Australian Knights Bachelor
Australian politicians awarded knighthoods
Irish emigrants to colonial Australia
Irish nationalists
Labour lawyers
Members of the Western Australian Legislative Assembly
People from County Tipperary
Australian Labor Party members of the Parliament of Western Australia